Stahl Lake is a lake in McLeod County, in the U.S. state of Minnesota.

Stahl Lake was named for Charles Stahl, a pioneer who settled there.

References

Lakes of Minnesota
Lakes of McLeod County, Minnesota